KRED is a commercial radio station in Eureka, California, broadcasting on 92.3 FM.  KRED airs country music programming from Jones Radio Networks.

External links
Official Website

RED
Country radio stations in the United States
Mass media in Humboldt County, California